Michaël Trahan (born 1984) is a Canadian poet from Quebec.

Born and raised in Acton Vale, he moved to Montreal in the early 2000s. His first book of poetry, Nœud coulant, won the Prix Émile-Nelligan, the Prix Alain-Grandbois and the Prix du Festival de la poésie de Montréal in 2014. His second book, La raison des fleurs, won the Governor General's Award for French-language poetry at the 2018 Governor General's Awards.

He is also the author of La postérité du scandale : Petite histoire de la réception de Sade (1909-1939), a non-fiction study of the writings of the Marquis de Sade.

References

1984 births
21st-century Canadian poets
21st-century Canadian non-fiction writers
21st-century Canadian male writers
Canadian male poets
Canadian literary critics
Canadian poets in French
Canadian non-fiction writers in French
Writers from Montreal
French Quebecers
Governor General's Award-winning poets
Living people
People from Montérégie
Canadian male non-fiction writers
Prix Alain-Grandbois
Academic staff of Université Laval